Tomato is an unincorporated community in Mississippi County, Arkansas, United States. Tomato is known for its unusual place name.

References

Unincorporated communities in Mississippi County, Arkansas
Unincorporated communities in Arkansas
Arkansas placenames of Native American origin